Star Range is a small mountain range in Beaver County, Utah, U.S.

Star Range may also refer to:

Star Mountains, the "Star Range" of Papua New Guinea
The "Star" range of motorcycles by the Yamaha Motor Company

See also
Sierra Estrella (Spanish for Star Range), a mountain range located southwest of Phoenix, Arizona,U.S.